The 2016 Teenage Mutant Ninja Turtles 400 was a NASCAR Sprint Cup Series stock car race held on September 18, 2016, at Chicagoland Speedway in Joliet, Illinois. Contested over 270 laps on the  intermediate speedway, it was the 27th race of the 2016 NASCAR Sprint Cup Series season, first race of the Chase and first race of the Round of 16, Furniture Row Racing's Martin Truex Jr. won his first career race in Chicagoland and third race of the 2016 season, to advance to the second round of the Chase.

Joey Logano made his way to a second-place finish, the race had nine lead changes among different drivers and four cautions for 22 laps.

Report

Background

Chicagoland Speedway is a  tri-oval speedway in Joliet, Illinois, southwest of Chicago. The speedway opened in 2001 and currently hosts NASCAR racing including the opening event in the Chase for the Sprint Cup. Until 2011, the speedway also hosted the IndyCar Series, recording numerous close finishes including the closest finish in IndyCar history. The speedway is owned and operated by International Speedway Corporation and located adjacent to Route 66 Raceway.

Entry list
The preliminary entry list for the race included 40 cars and was released on September 12, 2016, at 11:36 a.m. Eastern time.

Qualifying
Qualifying for Friday was cancelled due to rain. Kyle Busch was awarded the pole position as a result.

Starting lineup

Practice

First practice

Second practice

Final practice

Race

First half

Under clear blue Illinois skies, Kyle Busch led the field to the green flag at 2:49 p.m. He led the first 22 laps before Martin Truex Jr. powered by on the outside exiting turn 2 to take the lead on lap 23. Green flag stops commenced on lap 48, and a tire that came from the stall of Aric Almirola and came to a stop in the frontstretch grass area brought out the first caution of the race on lap 49. Jimmie Johnson, who made it across the start/finish line on pit road before Truex crossed the line on the track, remained on the lead lap and assumed the lead after he opted to stay out when Truex pitted. Kevin Harvick, who worked his way up to eighth after starting the race from the rear end of the field for an unapproved adjustment, didn't beat Truex back to the line and was trapped a lap down for much of the race.

The race restarted on lap 56. Truex, who was running second, made an unscheduled stop on lap 70 for a flat right-rear tire. He rejoined the race in 21st one lap down. Green flag stops started again on lap 103. Johnson hit pit road the next lap and handed the lead to Brad Keselowski. He pitted the next lap and the lead cycled back to Johnson. Casey Mears was issued a pass through penalty for speeding on pit road and then was issued a stop and go penalty for speeding on his pass through.

The second caution of the race flew on lap 119 for Brian Scott getting loose and spinning out in turn 4. Matt Kenseth was sent to the tail end of the field on the ensuing restart for speeding on pit road.

Second half
The race restarted on lap 126. This run was much like the second run in which the field settled into a rhythm of green flag racing. During this run, Harvick came up and hit the 78 car. Truex said after the race in his media availability that "nothing led up to it. We hadn't been around each other all day, really. I passed him once earlier. I had fresh tires, he was lapped and that was after I had my flat (so) I was racing to get my lap back." The next round of green flag stops began on lap 172. Johnson pitted from the lead the same lap and handed the lead to Keselowski. He pitted on lap 174 and the lead cycled back to Johnson. Busch was issued a pass through penalty for speeding on pit road.

Busch worked his back onto the lead lap by driving around race leader Johnson on lap 182. That same lap, teammate Chase Elliott passed him for the lead exiting turn 4. Debris on the backstretch brought out the third caution of the race on lap 193.

The race restarted on lap 199. Not much happened until the final round of green flag pit stops with 33 laps to go. Elliott pitted with 32 to go and handed the lead to Denny Hamlin. He pitted with 30 to go and handed the lead to Ryan Blaney. He pitted with 25 to go and handed the lead to Alex Bowman. He pitted with 19 to go and the lead cycled back to Elliott. During the pit cycle, Johnson was issued a pass through penalty for speeding. He said after the race that he "just can’t believe I got in trouble down there leaving the pits. I feel terrible for these guys. It should have been a top-five day, but I will back down on pit road even more and try not to make that mistake. Hats off to the team for our fast Lowe’s Chevrolet, I just screwed up.”

Truex was gaining ground on Elliott in the closing laps of the race, but not enough to catch him with the laps remaining. Unfortunately for Elliott, a shredded right-front tire from the No. 95 car of Michael McDowell brought out the fourth caution of the race with five laps to go and forced overtime. Three drivers: Blaney, who assumed the lead, Kasey Kahne and Carl Edwards, opted to stay out while the rest of the lead lap cars pitted. Truex exited pit road ahead of Elliott.

Overtime
The race restarted with two laps to go. Blaney was no match on old tires against Truex on new tires. Truex passed him on the backstretch with two to go and drove on to score the victory.

Post-race

Driver comments
“The racing gods want to make it difficult on us,” Truex said in victory lane. “Man, this feels good. I’m a lucky guy to be able to drive this black 78. (Crew chief) Cole Pearn, Jazzy (Team Engineer Jeff Curtis), everybody on this team, the pit crew, Barney (Team Owner Visser) for giving us everything we need. This is the way we wanted to start the Chase. It feels awesome.” “On one hand the bad luck was going to bite us and on the other we had a lot of time to battle back,” he added. “We’re lucky it happened early and we were able to have an awesome racecar all day.”

Truex's car failed post-race LIS (Laser Inspection Station) after the race. The failure was not considered "encumbered" and he was allowed to keep the benefits of his win.

Joey Logano, who finished runner-up, said his day saw "awesome execution by the 22 team. From every angle. We had a very fast race car and were awesome on pit road. You want to talk about pressure, not just Chase pressure, but coming down at the end of the race to try to win, they executed and had an awesome pit stop and beat the 11 out and ultimately gives us a second place finish. I couldn’t be more proud of the team and the way we executed and attacked today. We will take this momentum and run with it the next nine weeks.”

Elliott, who was leading the race with five to go and finished third, said he "felt like we did a good job as a team today trying to control the things that we could control. And you can't control when a caution is going to come out. Granted, you can expect one a lot of the time, but you can't control when it's going to happen, and you certainly can't control how many guys are going to stay out on tires and try to make something happen at the end of a race. That's just a part of life, part of racing." He added that he was "proud of that (speed his car showed); we are proud of the run we had today,” he said. “Obviously, hate to come up short, but that is part of life some days. We were fast and I think that is something to be happy about and we can move forward to Loudon (next week) with some motivation.”

“You know, it was a long day for us for sure,” said Blaney. “We passed a lot of cars. We didn’t start good. We started 22nd. Worked on our car all day and got it better and better each run. There was maybe only one run where I thought we went backwards. We fixed it right away and started going back forward again. That was promising. I think we were seventh before that last caution. Decided to stay out. “We initially decided if we could get to the front two rows, we were going to stay out. Then you kind of had a shot. But then everyone came. We decided to stay out anyway. That put us in the best position possible being able to restart the race. Knew it was going to be tough when only a couple cars stayed out with us. We needed about two or three more for it to be a realistic shot.”

Race results

Race summary
 Lead changes: 9 among different drivers
 Cautions/Laps: 4 for 22
 Red flags: 0
 Time of race: 2 hours, 47 minutes and 24 seconds
 Average speed:

Media

Television
NBC Sports covered the race on the television side. Rick Allen, Jeff Burton and Steve Letarte had the call in the booth for the race. Dave Burns, Mike Massaro, Marty Snider and Kelli Stavast reported from pit lane during the race.

Radio
The Motor Racing Network had the radio call for the race, which was simulcast on Sirius XM NASCAR Radio.

Standings after the race

<small>Note: Only the first 16 positions are included for the driver standings.

References

Teenage Mutant Ninja Turtles 400
Teenage Mutant Ninja Turtles 400
NASCAR races at Chicagoland Speedway
Teenage Mutant Ninja Turtles 400
Teenage Mutant Ninja Turtles